Barbados competed at the 2016 Summer Olympics in Rio de Janeiro, Brazil, from 5 to 21 August 2016. This was the nation's twelfth appearance at the Summer Olympics, with the exception of the 1980 Summer Olympics in Moscow, because of its partial support to the United States-led boycott.

The Barbados Olympic Association registered a total of 12 athletes, 7 men and 5 women, to compete in five different sports at these Games, doubling the nation's roster size from London 2012. Among the sports played by the athletes, Barbados marked its Olympic debut in tennis and triathlon, and the return of females to the team for the first time after sending only men to the previous Games.

The Barbadian team featured only two returning Olympians; skeet shooter Michael Maskell, who staged a comeback in Rio for his fifth Olympic appearance as the most experienced member after a twelve-year absence, and sprinter Ramon Gittens, who became the nation's flag bearer in the opening ceremony.

Barbados, however, failed to win a single Olympic medal since the 2000 Summer Olympics in Sydney, where sprinter Obadele Thompson took the bronze in the men's 100 metres.

Athletics (track and field)
 
Barbadian athletes have so far achieved qualifying standards in the following athletics events (up to a maximum of 3 athletes in each event):

Track & road events

Field events

Combined events – Women's heptathlon

Shooting
 
Barbados has received an invitation from the Tripartite Commission to send Michael Maskell, who will compete at his fifth Olympics, in the men's skeet, as long as the minimum qualifying score (MQS) was met by 31 March 2016. This also signified the nation's comeback to the sport for the first time since 2004.

Qualification Legend: Q = Qualify for the next round; q = Qualify for the bronze medal (shotgun)

Swimming

Barbados has received a Universality invitation from FINA to send two swimmers (one male and one female) to the Olympics.

Tennis
 
Barbados has received an invitation from the Tripartite Commission to send Darian King (world no. 278) in the men's singles into the Olympic tennis tournament, signifying the nation's debut in the sport.

Triathlon
 
Barbados has entered one triathlete to compete at the Games, signifying the nation's Olympic debut in the sport. Jason Wilson was ranked among the top 40 eligible triathletes in the men's event based on the ITU Olympic Qualification List as of 15 May 2016.

See also
Barbados at the 2015 Pan American Games

References

External links 

 

Nations at the 2016 Summer Olympics
2016
Olympics